Karan English (born March 23, 1949) is an American politician who served in the U.S. House of Representatives of the 103rd United States Congress from 1993 to 1995.

A Democrat, English represented Arizona's 6th Congressional District, which in the 1990s included much of Mesa, Scottsdale and northeast Arizona. Prior to her election to the U.S. House of Representatives, English served as an Arizona State Senator (1991–1993), State Representative (1987–1991), and Coconino County supervisor (1981–1987).  In the Arizona senate, English developed a reputation as a liberal on fiscal, social and environmental issues.

Despite being heavily outspent during her campaign, English won her 1992 General Election race against Republican Doug Wead after being endorsed by former U.S. Senator Barry Goldwater. Goldwater said he thought Wead was out of touch with Arizona because of his relatively brief residency in the state—two years to English's 22. Wead countered that Goldwater's support of abortion rights spurred the unexpected crossing of party lines. English may have also benefited from Democratic Party momentum in 1992, which was the year of Bill Clinton's first presidential election victory. Clinton came within a few percentage points of winning Arizona, and two other Democratic Representatives (Ed Pastor and Sam Coppersmith) were elected along with English to give Democrats the majority of the state's House delegation.

She was the second woman to represent Arizona in Congress, with Isabella Selmes Greenway (1933–1937) being the first.

After serving a single term in Congress, English was defeated by Republican challenger J.D. Hayworth in 1994.

She is now involved with the Center for Sustainable Environments at Northern Arizona University and is a member of the ReFormers Caucus of Issue One.

See also

 Women in the United States House of Representatives

Notes
 
 Arizona Women's Political Caucus

References

Sources
 Biographical Directory of the United States Congress: Karan English

External links
 Northern Arizona University: Cline Library Digital Archives search results for "Karan English"
 

1949 births
Democratic Party Arizona state senators
County supervisors in Arizona
Living people
Politicians from Berkeley, California
University of Arizona alumni
Democratic Party members of the Arizona House of Representatives
Female members of the United States House of Representatives
Women state legislators in Arizona
Democratic Party members of the United States House of Representatives from Arizona
21st-century American women